Raozan Government College,Chittagong is a government-run, honors-level, degree college in Raozan Upazila, Chittagong District, Bangladesh. It was founded in 1963 by AKM Fazlul Kabir Chowdhury, a member of the East Pakistan Provincial Assembly.

In 2017, the Directorate of Secondary and Higher Education ordered that the college, which had been private, be nationalized.

BDT 12.1 million (US$150,000) has been allocated for the construction of a four-story information technology building.

References

Colleges in Chittagong
Educational institutions established in 1963
1963 establishments in East Pakistan